Surt may also refer to:
 Sirte, a city in Libya
 Sirte District
 Surtr, a figure in Norse myth
 Surt (volcano), on the moon Io